Broadway–Slavic Village is a neighborhood on the Southeast side of Cleveland, Ohio. One of the city's oldest neighborhoods, it originated as the township of Newburgh, first settled in 1799. Much of the area has historically served as home to Cleveland's original Czech and Polish immigrants. While demographics have shifted over the decades, the largest part of Broadway today, Slavic Village, is named for these earlier communities.

Broadway is bordered to the west and northwest by Cuyahoga Valley, to the north by the Central neighborhood, to the east by the neighborhoods of Union–Miles Park and Kinsman, the suburbs of Cuyahoga Heights and Newburgh Heights to the west and southwest and Garfield Heights to the south.

Slavic Village

The historic Slavic Village is named for what was once a predominantly Central European neighborhood centered on Fleet Avenue and Broadway. The neighborhood's name encompasses two smaller ethnically sub-divided sections: the larger Czech-dominated Karlin, and the heavily Polish Warszawa districts.

Slavic Village is combining the Warszawa site the Polish immigrants settled in 1870. The lives of these immigrants were centered on the hamlets they've formed and the St. Stanislaus Church they built. Its exact location is at East 65th Street and Forman Avenue, and the thriving Polish commercial center along Fleet Avenue and East 71st Street.  The population of Poles and other Central Europeans in the neighborhood peaked in the period from 1920s to 1940 and began to decline during migration of the people to the villages, when the city suffered demographic decline during the 1950s and 1960s. On November 28, 1980, Warszawa was added to the National Register of Historic Places as Warszawa Neighborhood District.

An attempt to revitalize the neighborhood was undertaken with the organization of Neighborhood Ventures, Inc., in 1977.  With Teddy and Donna Sliwinski, along with architect Kaszimier Wieclaw, the area began to come alive once again.  In order to attract people of various Slavic European descent, the name of the region was changed to "Slavic Village".

The nonprofit Slavic Village Assn. was organized in 1978 to preserve residential and commercial buildings through its sponsorship of the annual Slavic Village Harvest Festival, which in its 17th year (1993) was drawing 100,000 people. Between 1987 and 1990, the Slavic Village Assn. merged with the Broadway Development Corporation as the Slavic Village Broadway Development Corporation to coordinate community-based revitalization activities in the Broadway neighborhood. The Slavic Village Broadway Development Corporation is now known as just Slavic Village Development, and cites an "investment of $160 million over the past 22 years to improve Slavic Village."

More recently, Slavic Village has seen difficult times.  The zip code that includes the neighborhood, 44105, recorded more home foreclosures than any other zip code in the country during the second quarter of 2007, causing the national media to declare the neighborhood the center of the 2007 foreclosure crisis

The neighborhood saw an increase in property crime, violent crime, and prostitution during 2007, attributed to youth gangs and drug dealers taking advantage of the high number of home foreclosures.

The City's plan to eliminate the 3rd police district, which includes Slavic Village, had been an issue of concern for some residents, as voiced by then-councilman Anthony Brancatelli. In May 2008, the former 3rd District Police headquarters closed and Slavic Village policing responsibility was redrawn between the 3rd and 5th Police Districts, increasing the number of police cars on the street.  Subsequently, Councilman Brancatelli stated he was satisfied with the resulting improved police response time and police presence.

In July 2008, Slavic Village was one of six neighborhoods of the Neighborhood Strategic Investment Initiatives featured locally in an audio discussion titled "Conversations in Slavic Village" held by the Case Western Reserve Studies Symposium. Stakeholders discussed how neighborhoods are vital to the livable city. Speakers cited specific events occurring in direct counterexample to the increased crime reported in the media in 2007. Representatives included a savings and loan association official, steel mill corporate social responsibility manager, public art coordinator, community development corporation director, and local metropark, youth organization, and cultural center directors.

Slavic Village is served by the Fleet Branch of the Cleveland Public Library system.

References

External links

 Audio discussion of Slavic Village of the Neighborhood Strategic Investment Initiatives hosted by the Case Western Reserve Studies Symposium, referencing Norman Krumholz and Neighborhood Community Development Corporations Western Reserve Studies Symposium: College of Arts and Sciences: Case Western Reserve UniversityWestern Reserve Studies Symposium: College of Arts and Sciences: Case Western Reserve University
 The Encyclopedia Of Cleveland History by Cleveland Bicentennial Commission (Cleveland, Ohio), David D. Van Tassel (Editor), and John J. Grabowski (Editor) 
 Slavic Village Development

 Polish-American Cultural Center, Cleveland, OH

Neighborhoods in Cleveland
National Register of Historic Places in Cleveland, Ohio
Populated places established in the 1870s
Historic districts on the National Register of Historic Places in Ohio
1870s establishments in Ohio